In mathematics, and particularly topology, a fiber bundle (or, in Commonwealth English: fibre bundle) is a space that is  a product space, but  may have a different topological structure. The space  is known as the total space of the fiber bundle,  as the base space, and  the fiber.

In the trivial case,  is just  and the map  is just the projection from the product space to the first factor.  This is called a trivial bundle. Examples of non-trivial fiber bundles include the Möbius strip and Klein bottle, as well as nontrivial covering spaces.  Fiber bundles, such as the tangent bundle of a manifold and other more general vector bundles, play an important role in differential geometry and differential topology, as do principal bundles.

Mappings between total spaces of fiber bundles that "commute" with the projection maps are known as bundle maps, and the class of fiber bundles forms a category with respect to such mappings.

History 
In topology, the terms fiber (German: Faser) and fiber space (gefaserter Raum) appeared for the first time in a paper by Herbert Seifert in 1933, but his definitions are limited to a very special case. The main difference from the present day conception of a fiber space, however, was that for Seifert what is now called the base space (topological space) of a fiber (topological) space E was not part of the structure, but derived from it as a quotient space of E. The first definition of fiber space was given by Hassler Whitney in 1935  under the name sphere space, but in 1940 Whitney changed the name to sphere bundle.

The theory of fibered spaces, of which vector bundles, principal bundles, topological fibrations and fibered manifolds are a special case, is attributed to Seifert, Heinz Hopf, Jacques Feldbau, Whitney, Norman Steenrod, Charles Ehresmann, Jean-Pierre Serre, and others.

Fiber bundles became their own object of study in the period 1935–1940. The first general definition appeared in the works of Whitney.

Whitney came to the general definition of a fiber bundle from his study of a more particular notion of a sphere bundle, that is a fiber bundle whose fiber is a sphere of arbitrary dimension.

Formal definition 

We shall assume in what follows that the base space  is connected.

That is, the following diagram should commute:

Therefore  carries the quotient topology determined by the map 

A fiber bundle  is often denoted
 that, in analogy with a short exact sequence, indicates which space is the fiber, total space and base space, as well as the map from total to base space.

A  is a fiber bundle in the category of smooth manifolds.

Examples

Trivial bundle 

Let  and let  be the projection onto the first factor. Then  is a fiber bundle (of ) over  Here  is not just locally a product but globally one. Any fiber bundle over a contractible CW-complex is trivial.

Nontrivial bundles

Möbius strip 

Perhaps the simplest example of a nontrivial bundle  is the Möbius strip. It has the circle that runs lengthwise along the center of the strip as a base  and a line segment for the fiber , so the Möbius strip is a bundle of the line segment over the circle. The preimage  in the picture is a (somewhat twisted) slice of the strip four squares wide and one long (i.e. all the points that project to ).

This pair locally trivializes the strip. The corresponding trivial bundle  would be a cylinder, but the Möbius strip has an overall "twist". This twist is visible only globally; locally the Möbius strip and the cylinder are identical (making a single vertical cut in either gives the same space).

Klein bottle 

A similar nontrivial bundle is the Klein bottle, which can be viewed as a "twisted" circle bundle over another circle. The corresponding non-twisted (trivial) bundle is the 2-torus, .

Covering map 

A covering space is a fiber bundle such that the bundle projection is a local homeomorphism. It follows that the fiber is a discrete space.

Vector and principal bundles 

A special class of fiber bundles, called vector bundles, are those whose fibers are vector spaces (to qualify as a vector bundle the structure group of the bundle — see below — must be a linear group). Important examples of vector bundles include the tangent bundle and cotangent bundle of a smooth manifold. From any vector bundle, one can construct the frame bundle of bases, which is a principal bundle (see below).

Another special class of fiber bundles, called principal bundles, are bundles on whose fibers a free and transitive action by a group  is given, so that each fiber is a principal homogeneous space. The bundle is often specified along with the group by referring to it as a principal -bundle. The group  is also the structure group of the bundle.

Sphere bundles 

A sphere bundle is a fiber bundle whose fiber is an n-sphere. When the vector bundle in question is the tangent bundle , the unit sphere bundle is known as the unit tangent bundle. 

A sphere bundle is partially characterized by its Euler class, which is a degree  cohomology class in the total space of the bundle. In the case  the sphere bundle is called a circle bundle and the Euler class is equal to the first Chern class, which characterizes the topology of the bundle completely. For any , given the Euler class of a bundle, one can calculate its cohomology using a long exact sequence called the Gysin sequence.

Mapping tori 

Quotient spaces 

The most general conditions under which the quotient map will admit local cross-sections are not known, although if  is a Lie group and  a closed subgroup (and thus a Lie subgroup by Cartan's theorem), then the quotient map is a fiber bundle. From the perspective of Lie groups,  can be identified with the special unitary group . The abelian subgroup of diagonal matrices is isomorphic to the circle group , and the quotient  is diffeomorphic to the sphere.

More generally, if  is any topological group and  a closed subgroup that also happens to be a Lie group, then  is a fiber bundle.

Sections 

A  (or cross section) of a fiber bundle  is a continuous map  such that  for all x in B. Since bundles do not in general have globally defined sections, one of the purposes of the theory is to account for their existence. The obstruction to the existence of a section can often be measured by a cohomology class, which leads to the theory of characteristic classes in algebraic topology.

The most well-known example is the hairy ball theorem, where the Euler class is the obstruction to the tangent bundle of the 2-sphere having a nowhere vanishing section.

Often one would like to define sections only locally (especially when global sections do not exist). Sections form a sheaf.

Structure groups and transition functions 
Fiber bundles often come with a group of symmetries that describe the matching conditions between overlapping local trivialization charts. Specifically, let G be a topological group that acts continuously on the fiber space F on the left. We lose nothing if we require G to act faithfully on F so that it may be thought of as a group of homeomorphisms of F. A G-atlas for the bundle  is a set of local trivialization charts  such that for any  for the overlapping charts  and  the function

is given by

Two G-atlases are equivalent if their union is also a G-atlas. A G-bundle is a fiber bundle with an equivalence class of G-atlases.

In the smooth category, a G-bundle is a smooth fiber bundle where G is a Lie group and the corresponding action on F is smooth and the transition functions are all smooth maps.

The transition functions  satisfy the following conditions
 
 
 

The third condition applies on triple overlaps Ui ∩ Uj ∩ Uk and is called the cocycle condition (see Čech cohomology). The importance of this is that the transition functions determine the fiber bundle (if one assumes the Čech cocycle condition).

A principal G-bundle is a G-bundle where the fiber F is a principal homogeneous space for the left action of G itself (equivalently, one can specify that the action of G on the fiber F is free and transitive, i.e. regular). In this case, it is often a matter of convenience to identify F with G and so obtain a (right) action of G on the principal bundle.

Bundle maps 

It is useful to have notions of a mapping between two fiber bundles. A  or  consists of a pair of continuous functions

such that   That is, the following diagram is commutative:

For fiber bundles with structure group G and whose total spaces are (right) G-spaces (such as a principal bundle), bundle morphisms are also required to be G-equivariant on the fibers. This means that  is also G-morphism from one G-space to another, that is,  for all  and 

Differentiable fiber bundles 
In the category of differentiable manifolds, fiber bundles arise naturally as submersions of one manifold to another. Not every (differentiable) submersion  from a differentiable manifold M to another differentiable manifold N gives rise to a differentiable fiber bundle. However, this necessary condition is not quite sufficient, and there are a variety of sufficient conditions in common use.

If M and N are compact and connected, then any submersion  gives rise to a fiber bundle in the sense that there is a fiber space F diffeomorphic to each of the fibers such that  is a fiber bundle. (Surjectivity of  follows by the assumptions already given in this case.)

Generalizations 
 The notion of a bundle applies to many more categories in mathematics, at the expense of appropriately modifying the local triviality condition; cf. principal homogeneous space and torsor (algebraic geometry).
 In topology, a fibration is a mapping  that has certain homotopy-theoretic properties in common with fiber bundles.  Specifically, under mild technical assumptions a fiber bundle always has the homotopy lifting property or homotopy covering property (see  for details).  This is the defining property of a fibration.
 A section of a fiber bundle is a "function whose output range is continuously dependent on the input." This property is formally captured in the notion of dependent type.

See also 

 Affine bundle
 Algebra bundle
 Characteristic class
 Covering map
 Equivariant bundle
 Fibered manifold
 Fibration
 Gauge theory
 Hopf bundle
 I-bundle
 Natural bundle
 Principal bundle
 Projective bundle
 Pullback bundle
 Quasifibration
 Universal bundle
 Vector bundle
 Wu–Yang dictionary

Notes

References

External links 
 Fiber Bundle, PlanetMath
 
 Making John Robinson's Symbolic Sculpture `Eternity'
 Sardanashvily, Gennadi, Fibre bundles, jet manifolds and Lagrangian theory. Lectures for theoreticians,